is a public cemetery in Minami-Ikebukuro, Toshima, Tokyo, founded by the Tokyo Metropolitan government.

The cemetery is nonsectarian, and contains the graves of many famous people in its 10 ha area. It is maintained by the Tokyo Metropolitan Park Association.

History 
Zōshigaya Cemetery was founded by the local government of Tokyo Prefecture in 1874 as a public graveyard following the policy of the new government of the Meiji period, which prohibited burial in the central part of Tokyo.  Cremation was prohibited in 1873 and nine sites were designated new public graveyards in 1874. The local government of Tokyo prefecture established six cemeteries including Zōshigaya. Its construction and administration works were entrusted to the Tokyo Chamber (the Tokyo Chamber of Commerce and Industry of today). In 1876, the administration of the cemetery were taken into care by the prefectural government, and then by the Tokyo Metropolitan Park Association in 1985.

Burials 
Among those interred here are (Japanese surnames are in capital letters):
 OGATA Gekkō – Japanese painter and woodblock print artist of the ukiyo-e genre
 Lafcadio Hearn – International writer best known for his books about Japan
 Takio IZAWA – Japanese politician
 Kyōka IZUMI – Japanese writer of novels, short stories, and kabuki plays
 Kaita MURAYAMA – Japanese writer and painter
 KATŌ Hiroyuki – Japanese academic and politician of the Meiji period
 Hiroshi KAWAGUCHI – Japanese movie actor
 Matsutarō KAWAGUCHI – Japanese novelist, playwright, and movie producer of the Shōwa period
 Kyōsuke KINDAICHI – Japanese linguist
 KUBOTA Utsubo – Japanese lyric poet
 Kafū NAGAI – Japanese writer, playwright, essayist, and diarist
 NAKAHAMA Manjirō – One of the first Japanese people to visit the United States and translator
 Shōnen MATSUMURA – Japanese entomologist
 MORITA Sōhei – Japanese novelist and translator of Western literature of the late Meiji, Taishō and early Shōwa periods
 NARUSHIMA Ryūhoku – Japanese writer and scholar
 NATSUME Sōseki – Japanese novelist of the Meiji period
 OGINO Ginko – First licensed and practicing woman physician of Western medicine in Japan
 Shunrō OSHIKAWA – Japanese writer, journalist, and editor, best known as a pioneer of science fiction
 Yumeji TAKEHISA – Japanese poet and painter
 Seiji TŌGŌ – Japanese artist and painter
 Hideki TŌJŌ – Japanese general of the Imperial Japanese Army (IJA), the leader of the Taisei Yokusankai, and the 40th Prime Minister of Japan
 TSUNASHIMA Ryōsen – Japanese writer and philosopher
 Raphael von Koeber – German-Russian teacher of philosophy at the Tokyo Imperial University

Cultural references 
Before Natsume Sōseki himself was buried in Zōshigaya Cemetery, he selected the cemetery as the final resting place for the friend of the Sensei in the novel Kokoro (1914).

References 

 The history of Zōshigaya cemetery by Tokyo Metropolitan Park Association (Japanese)
 About Zōshigaya cemetery by Tokyo Metropolitan Park Association (Japanese)
 History of Tokyo City (東京市史稿 市街篇) (Japanese)

External links 
 Zōshigaya Cemetery (Tokyo Metropolitan Park Association) 
 Tokyo Metropolitan Park Association 
 

Cemeteries in Japan